The Corporations Act 2001 (Cth) is an Act of the Parliament of Australia, which sets out the laws dealing with business entities in the Commonwealth of Australia. The company is the Act's primary focus, but other entities, such as partnerships and managed investment schemes, are also regulated. The Act is the foundational basis of Australian corporate law, with every Australian state having adopted the Act as required by the Australian Constitution. 

The Act is the principal legislation regulating companies in Australia. It regulates matters such as the formation and operation of companies (in conjunction with a constitution that may be adopted by a company), duties of officers, takeovers and fundraising.

Background

Constitutional basis 
Australian corporate law was the subject of a successful legal challenge in the High Court of Australia in New South Wales v Commonwealth (1990) ('The Corporations Act Case'). In that case, the Commonwealth was found to have insufficient power to legislate in relation to the formation of companies. Section 51(xx) of the Australian Constitution was found to provide sufficient power for legislation applicable only to foreign corporations and corporations already formed within the Commonwealth. This decision led to the creation of a co-operative scheme, involving a referral of power from the Australian states.

Under the Corporations Agreement between the states and the Commonwealth, all changes to the Act must be referred to the Ministerial Council for Corporations (MINCO) for approval.  The co-operative scheme has come under pressure in recent times as the Commonwealth Government has sought to rely on the corporations power to legislate for its industrial relations reform agenda. This has led to some Labor states threatening to withdraw from the Corporations Agreement.

The Act
The Act is published in five volumes covering a total of ten chapters.  The chapters have multiple parts, and within each part there may be multiple divisions. Each chapter contains a collection of sections.

Volume 1

Chapters 1–2J
Chapter 1—Introductory
Chapter 2A—Registering a company
Chapter 2B—Basic features of a company
Chapter 2C—Registers
Chapter 2D—Officers and employees
Chapter 2E—Related party transactions
Chapter 2F—Members’ rights and remedies
Chapter 2G—Meetings
Chapter 2H—Shares
Chapter 2J—Transactions affecting share capital

Volume 2

Chapters 2L–5B
Chapter 2L—Debentures
Chapter 2M—Financial reports and audit
Chapter 2N—Updating ASIC information about companies and registered schemes
Chapter 2P—Lodgments with ASIC
Chapter 5—External administration
Chapter 5A—Deregistration, and transfer of registration, of companies
Chapter 5B—Bodies corporate registered as companies, and registrable bodies

Volume 3

Chapters 5C–6D
Chapter 5C—Managed investment schemes
Chapter 6—Takeovers
Chapter 6A—Compulsory acquisitions and buy‑outs
Chapter 6B—Rights and liabilities in relation to Chapter 6 and 6A matters
Chapter 6C—Information about ownership of listed companies and managed investment schemes
Chapter 6CA—Continuous disclosure
Chapter 6D—Fundraising

Volume 4

Chapter 7
Chapter 7—Financial services and markets
Part 7.10—Market misconduct and other prohibited conduct relating to financial products and financial services
1041A Market manipulation

Volume 5

Schedules 3 and 4
Schedule 3—Penalties
Schedule 4—Transfer of financial institutions and friendly societies

Amendments 
The Corporate Law Economic Reform Program Act 2004 simplified the statute, which, at 3,354 pages, dwarfs those of other nations such as Sweden, whose corporations statute is less than 200 pages long.

See also
 Income Tax Assessment Act 1936
 Income Tax Assessment Act 1997
 Australian Takeovers Panel

External links
Corporations Act 2001, at ComLaw
Corporations Regulations 2001, at ComLaw
  (which mentions the complexity of the Corporations Act

2001 in Australian law
Acts of the Parliament of Australia
Australian corporate law